Paleoism may refer to:

 Paleoconservatism, an anti-communist and anti-imperialist political philosophy in the United States
 Paleolibertarianism, a school of thought within American libertarianism with a strong emphasis on cultural conservatism

See also
 Classical liberalism
 Liberalism
 Old Left
 Paleo (disambiguation)